Lucic may refer to one of two Slavic surnames:
Lučić
Lucić